Kete is a Bantu language of the Democratic Republic of the Congo.

References

Luban languages